Rune Larsson may refer to:

 Rune Larsson (athlete), Swedish sprinter and hurdler
 Rune Larsson (referee), Swedish football referee
 Rune Larsson (footballer), Swedish football, ice hockey and bandy player